Negastriinae is a subfamily of click beetles in the family Elateridae.

North American Genera
 Fleutiauxellus Méquignon, 1930 g b
 Microhypnus Kishii, 1976 g b
 Migiwa Kishii, 1966 g b
 Negastrius C.G.Thomson, 1859 g b
 Neohypdonus Stibick, 1971 g b
 Oedostethus LeConte, 1853 g b
 Paradonus Stibick, 1971 g b
 Zorochros Thompson, 1858 g b
Data sources: i = ITIS, c = Catalogue of Life, g = GBIF, b = Bugguide.net

References

Further reading

External links

 

Elateridae